Sándor Csányi (born 20 March 1953) is a Hungarian billionaire businessman and banker. He is the chairman and chief executive officer (CEO) of OTP Bank Group, one of the largest financial groups in the CEE Region and the largest bank in Hungary. He is a shareholder and board member of the Hungarian-based multinational oil and gas company, MOL Group. He owns Bonafarm, the holding company of a Hungarian agricultural and food manufacture group.  With an estimated wealth of 393,4 billion forint ($1,33 billion) as of 2021, he is according to Forbes, the  2nd wealthiest person in Hungary, and the country's first billionaire.

Early life 

Sándor Csányi was born on the 20 March 1953 in a lower middle-class agricultural family in Jászárokszállás. His father, József Csányi was the field guard of the cooperative of Jászárokszállás. His mother, Amália Ballagó was a line driver also in the town's cooperative. He has two brothers. His parents were beekeepers and produced sugar beets. He is of Jassic descent.

When he was 14 years old, he moved from rural Hungary to Budapest.

Education 
He graduated from Budapest Business School in 1974 with a bachelor's degree in business administration and in 1980 from the Budapest University of Economics with a degree in economics and thereafter received his doctorate in 1983.

Career 
After graduation he worked at the Revenue Directorate and then at the Secretariat of the Ministry of Finance. Between 1983 and 1986, he was a departmental head at the Ministry of Agriculture and Food Industry. From 1986 to 1989 he worked as a head of department at Magyar Hitel Bank. He was deputy CEO of Kereskedelmi és Hitelbank from 1989 to 1992. In 1992 he became chairman & CEO of OTP Bank Group and fired a number of managers (which was unheard of in a formerly socialistic country). He is responsible for the Bank's strategy and overall operation. After the privatization of OTP Bank in 1995, he started focusing on questions of broader strategic development. Through a series of acquisitions and steady organic growth, OTP Group has become one of the major financial institutions in Central Eastern Europe with a footprint in 11 countries; through its 1 656 branches and online channels OTP Group offers universal banking services to over 18.5 million customers.

He is Vice Chairman of the Board of Directors of MOL Group  and Co-Chairman of Chinese-Hungarian Business Council.

He has been chairman of the Hungarian Football Federation (MLSZ) since July 2010.

In 2015, he was elected to the UEFA Executive Committee, and in March 2017 he was elected as a member of the FIFA Council, before being named vice president of FIFA in February 2019. Csányi was also appointed as a UEFA vice-president in February 2019. He is the Chairman of the UEFA National Team Competition Committee and member of the UEFA Finance
Committee. He is a member of UEFA Professional Football Strategy Council.

He is the owner of PICK Szeged Handball Club. He is the Honorary Vice President of the International Judo Federation.

He maintained personal friendships with leading politicians, such as then Minister of Finance, later Prime Minister Péter Medgyessy and Prime Minister Viktor Orbán. His net worth is estimated at over US$1.33 billion.

Together with other rich people of the country, he was implicated with the leaked documents Panama Papers in 2016. He justified his connection with the argument that it had been necessary due to international cooperation.

Personal life 
He is married to Erika Csányi, they live in Budapest, and have five children.

References

External links

 

 
 

 
 

 
 

1953 births
Living people
Hungarian economists
Hungarian chief executives
Members of the UEFA Executive Committee
Hungarian billionaires
Hungarian businesspeople
Hungarian bankers
Corvinus University of Budapest alumni
People from Jász-Nagykun-Szolnok County